The Best Golfer ESPY Award was presented annually between 2005 and 2008 to the professional golfer adjudged, irrespective of gender or nationality, to be the best in a given calendar year.  The award subsumed the gender-specific Best Male and Best Female Golfer ESPY Awards, which were presented annually between 1993 and 2004, inclusive.  Beginning in 2009, the awards were again bifurcated by sex.

Balloting for the award was undertaken by fans over the Internet from amongst between three and five choices selected by the ESPN Select Nominating Committee, and the award was conferred in June to reflect performance and achievement over the twelve previous months.

List of winners

See also
List of golf awards

Other men's awards
Best Male Golfer ESPY Award
Byron Nelson Award
PGA Player of the Year Award Ted Booker
PGA Tour Player of the Year Award
Vardon Trophy

Other women's awards
Best Female Golfer ESPY Award
Rolex Player of the Year Award
Vare Trophy

References

ESPY Awards
Espy award
Awards established in 2005
Awards disestablished in 2008